Patrick Joseph Thomas Sheridan K.H.S., K.M., (March 10, 1922 – December 2, 2011) was an American prelate of the Catholic Church who served as Auxiliary Bishop of the Archdiocese of New York from 1990 until his retirement in 2001.

Biography
Sheridan was born in New York and ordained a priest on March 1, 1947.

He was appointed Auxiliary Bishop of the Archdiocese of New York and titular bishop of Cursola on October 30, 1990, and was consecrated bishop on December 30, 1990. He served as vicar general of the archdiocese from 1987 to 2001, the chief deputy to Archbishops John O'Connor and Edward Egan.

References

20th-century American Roman Catholic titular bishops
1922 births
2011 deaths
People of the Roman Catholic Archdiocese of New York